Bon-e Dab (also Romanized as Bon-e Dāb) is a village in Jastun Shah Rural District, Hati District, Lali County, Khuzestan Province, Iran. At the 2006 census, its population was 126, in 22 families.

References 

Populated places in Lali County